DX10 was a general purpose international, multitasking operating system designed to operate
with the Texas Instruments 990/10, 990/10A and 990/12 minicomputers using the memory mapping feature.

The Disk Executive Operating System (DX10)

DX10 was a versatile disk-based operating system capable of supporting a wide
range of commercial and industrial applications.
DX10 was also a multiterminal system capable of making each of several users
appear to have exclusive control of the system.

DX10 was an international operating system designed to meet the commercial
requirements of the United States, most European countries, and Japan.
DX10 supported several models of video display terminals (VDTs), most of which
permit users to enter, view, and process data in their own language.

DX10 Capabilities

DX10 required a basic hardware configuration, but allows additional members of
an extensive group of peripherals to be included in the configuration.
During system generation, the user could configure DX10 to support peripheral devices
that are not members of the 990 family and devices that require realtime
support.
This capability required that the user also provide software control for these
devices.

The user communicated with DX10 easily through the System Command Interpreter (SCI).
SCI was designed to provide simple, convenient interaction between the user and
DX10 in a conversational format.
Through SCI the user had access to complete control of DX10.
SCI was flexible in its mode of communication.
While SCI is convenient for interactive communication through a data terminal,
SCI can be accessed in batch mode as well.

DX10 was capable of extensive file management.
The built-in file structures include key indexed files, relative record files,
and sequential files.
A group of file control utilities exists for copying and modifying files, and
controlling file parameters.

DX10 Features

DX10 offered a number of features that provide convenient use of the minicomputers system capabilities:
Easy system generation for systems with custom device configurations.  With proper preparation, peripheral devices that are not part of the 990 computer family can be interfaced through DX10.
A macro assembler for translating assembly language programs into executable machine code.
A text editor for entering source code or data into accessible files.
Support of high-level languages, including Fortran, COBOL, Pascal, RPG II, and BASIC.
A link editor and extended debugging facilities are provided to further support program development.

References

External links
 Dave Pitts' TI 990 page — Includes a simulator and DX10 Operating System images.
 

Proprietary operating systems
Texas Instruments